Valley College station is a station on the G Line of the Los Angeles Metro Busway system.  It is named after the adjacent Los Angeles Valley College.

The station is in the Valley Glen district of the City of Los Angeles, located on Burbank Boulevard and Fulton Avenue, in the eastern San Fernando Valley.

Service

Station Layout

Hours and frequency

Connections 
, the following connections are available:
 Los Angeles Metro Bus: , 
 LADOT Commuter Express: 
 LADOT DASH: Van Nuys/Studio City

Notable places nearby 
The station is within walking distance of the following notable places:
Los Angeles Valley College

Station artwork

The floor mural and fence art in this station is called "Former Location/ Contemporary Portrait" by Laura London. It depicts of several old-fashioned black and white photos that reflects of the rock-and-roll ages and their trends, including some far-scaled portrait albums from the 1960s from The Rolling Stones. The art is also at the setting where Valley College used to exist during the earlier days, now California State University Northridge. The floor mural simply depicts of the black-and-white old age symbolism.

References

External links

LA Metro: Orange Line Timetable - schedules
LA Metro: Orange Line map and stations - route map and station addresses and features
Orange Line history
LA Metro - countywide: official website

G Line (Los Angeles Metro)
Los Angeles Metro Busway stations
Los Angeles Valley College
North Hollywood, Los Angeles
Van Nuys, Los Angeles
Public transportation in the San Fernando Valley
Public transportation in Los Angeles
Bus stations in Los Angeles
Valley Glen, Los Angeles